The Catholic Church in East Timor, based only from Latin rites, currently consists of one archdiocese and two dioceses forming an ecclesiastical province. Previously, it only comprised three exempt dioceses, all immediately subjecting to the Holy See and depending on the Roman Congregation for the Evangelization of Peoples. On September 11, 2019, Pope Francis elevated the Diocese of Dili to the rank of a metropolitan archdiocese and, at the same time, formed the Ecclesiastical Province of Dili. He also raised Bishop Virgílio do Carmo da Silva to the rank of an archbishop.

All of the dioceses in East Timor joint in a national Episcopal conference of Timor (Conferência Episcopal Timorense). There is an Apostolic Nunciature as papal diplomatic representation (embassy-level) to Timor-Leste (East Timor), but it is located in giant neighbor Indonesia's capital Jakarta, at the same address as the Apostolic Nunciature to Indonesia, which however has another incumbent.

There are no Eastern Catholic, pre-diocesan or defunct jurisdictions.

List of dioceses

Ecclesiastical Province of Dili 
 Roman Catholic Archdiocese of Díli: Mgr. Virgílio do Carmo da Silva, S.D.B.
 Roman Catholic Diocese of Baucau: Mgr. D. Basílio do Nascimento
 Roman Catholic Diocese of Maliana: Mgr. Norberto do Amaral

See also 
 List of Catholic dioceses (structured view)
 Catholic Church in East Timor

References

Sources and external links 
 GCatholic.org - data for all sections.
 Catholic-Hierarchy.

East Timor
East Timor religion-related lists